Tampuon may refer to:

 Tampuan people, also spelled "Tampuon"
 Tampuon language